Boyd Brown (May 24, 1952 – December 18, 2014) was an American football tight end. He played for the Denver Broncos from 1974 to 1976 and for the New York Giants in 1977.

References

1952 births
2014 deaths
American football tight ends
Alcorn State Braves football players
Denver Broncos players
New York Giants players
Players of American football from Mississippi